Macheng is a city in northeastern Hubei province, People's Republic of China, bordering the provinces of Henan to the north and Anhui to the northeast. It is a county-level city under the administration of Huanggang City and abuts the south side of the Dabie Mountains. Total population was 849,092 at the 2010 census.

History
Macheng has a long history, dating back to the Spring and Autumn period as part of the state of Chu, and was the site of the historic Battle of Boju fought between Chu and Wu in 506 BC. It was named Macheng in 598 AD.

In 1927, a major peasant revolt erupted in Macheng, creating a strong base for the ensuing Communist revolution in 1949. More than 100,000 people joined Mao's Red Army under local Generals, Wang Shusheng and Chen Zaidao. A guerilla base in Macheng was eliminated in the Campaign to Suppress Bandits in Dabieshan.

Macheng played a key role during the Great Leap Forward. In an effort to increase crop yields, the local communist cadres began demolishing walls of old buildings, abandoned huts and farm stables where animals had urinated to provide nutrients for the soil. In January 1958, Macheng County was exalted by the provincial party secretary, Wang Renzhong. for reaching a rice yield of six tonnes per hectare. The People's Daily applauded the efforts in an op-ed and labelled it as a 'model commune' which attracted more than half a million cadres in 1958, including Zhou Enlai, Chen Yi and Li Xiannian. Spurred on by the positive coverage, overzealous local officials destroyed more than 50,000 houses in an effort to make more manure which spurred other neighboring counties and provinces to follow. More than 30-40% of all houses in China were destroyed following this incident during the Great Leap Forward.

Geography

Administrative Divisions
Macheng administers:

Geography of city
The county-level city of Macheng has a total land area of 3,600 km2 (1,400 sq mi). It is located in the northeastern portions of Hubei. Most of the higher elevation portions of the Dabie Mountains is on the northern portions of the city. It is bordered by Henan to the northwest and Anhui to the northeast respectively. The region where Macheng is located is considered as a subtropical area and the Dabie mountainous terrain is mainly to the north and northeast.

Climate
Macheng has a humid subtropical climate (Köppen climate classification: Cfa) with very hot summers and relatively cold winters.

Economy

Transportation
There are two railway stations in Macheng. Macheng railway station is on the Beijing–Kowloon railway between Beijing and Hong Kong. Macheng North railway station is on the Hefei–Wuhan railway.

Villages

Xiangqishan Village

References

 Google Maps Mangcheng
 Willam T. Rowe, Crimson Rain: Seven Centuries of Violence in a Chinese County (Stanford: Stanford University Press, 2007), 

Cities in Hubei
Huanggang
County-level divisions of Hubei